The rivalry between the England and Australia national rugby union teams started on 9 January 1909 at Blackheath's Rectory Field in England, during the 1908–09 Australia rugby union tour of Britain, dubbed the 1st Wallabies. The Wallabies won the match 9–3. The two nations next met in 1928, at Twickenham, during the 1927–28 Waratahs tour of the British Isles, France and Canada and England won 18–11. After the 1939–40 Australia rugby union tour of Britain and Ireland was cancelled due to the outbreak of World War II, twenty years passed before England and Australia next met, again at Twickenham, with Australia winning the 1948 test 11–0. It would then be another decade until the two nations played another test against one another. In 1958, they met again at Twickenham, and England won 9–6.

England and Australia played each other twice during the 1960s, first in 1963, when the Wallabies defeated England 18–9 at Sydney's Sports Ground, during England’s first tour overseas. They met again in 1967 during the 1966–67 Australia rugby union tour of Britain, Ireland and France and Australia triumphed 23–11 at Twickenham. The nations played each other another four times during the 1970s; with England winning 20–3 at Twickenham in 1973, Australia winning 16–9 at the Sydney Cricket Ground in 1975 and again one week later 30–21 at Ballymore during the 1975 England rugby union tour of Australia, and England winning in 1976, 23–6 at Twickenham, as part of the 1975–76 Australia rugby union tour of Britain, Ireland and the United States.

The two nations would meet six times during the 1980s, the first encounter was in 1982, during the 1981–82 Australia rugby union tour of Britain and Ireland with England defeating Australia 15–11 at Twickenham. Two years later the Wallabies were victorious at Twickenham, winning 19–3 on their way to winning their first and up to now only Grand Slam. The next match was a pool match in the inaugural 1987 Rugby World Cup at Sydney's Concord Oval in 1987, which Australia won 19–6. The nations played three times in 1988: Australia won 22–16 in Brisbane and 28–8 at the Concord Oval, during the 1988 England rugby union tour of Australia and Fiji with England winning the third and final match at Twickenham 28–19.

The sides met three times during the 1990s before the end of the amateur era and the introduction of the Cook Cup. The first match was in 1991 at the Sydney Football Stadium, won 40–15 by Australia. The next match was the 1991 Rugby World Cup Final at Twickenham, which the Wallabies won 12–6. with Tony Daly scoring the only try of the game. The last pre-Cook Cup match was a quarter-final tie at the 1995 Rugby World Cup in South Africa, played at Newlands Stadium in Cape Town. England won 25–22, thanks to a last-minute drop goal by Rob Andrew.

Cook Cup and Ella-Mobbs Trophy (since 1997)

The Cook Cup came about at the start of Rugby Union's professional era, when the Rugby Football Union (RFU) and the Australian Rugby Union (ARU) agreed to play each other on a home-and-away basis. The first Cook Cup match was played at Sydney's Aussie Stadium on 25 June 1997. Australia won the match 25–6. The series was however to be decided through two tests, and the second took place at Twickenham in London, this resulted in a 15–15 draw. Since Australia won the first test, they were crowned champions.

In 1998 Australia ran out 76-0 winners at Lang Park in Brisbane. The Wallabies were captained by John Eales, and in total, Australia scored 11 tries against a weakened England side. The subsequent meeting at Twickenham saw England lose by just one point, the score being 12–11. In 1999, the Cook Cup was decided through one match rather than two, as the 1999 Rugby World Cup meant that there was no space in the schedule for a November test match between the countries. Australia defeated England 22–15 at Stadium Australia. In 2000, the Cook Cup was again contested over a single match, due to the 2001 British Lions tour to Australia, and for the first time saw England and Australia meet as reigning champions of their respective hemispheres. The match was played at Twickenham, and England won 22–19 to win the Cook Cup for the first time.

The single-test format remained for 2002, and England successfully defended the Cook Cup by beating Australia 32–31 at Twickenham. In 2003, the Cook Cup was again decided over one match, owing to the 2003 Rugby World Cup. The match was played at Melbourne's Telstra Dome, and England won 25–14, marking their first ever victory over Australia on Australian soil. Later that year, England repeated the feat when the two nations met in what is arguably their most famous encounter, at the 2003 World Cup final. Jonny Wilkinson landed a drop goal in extra time that saw England win the Rugby World Cup 20–17.

The 2004 Cook Cup was contested over two matches. The first post-World Cup edition of the challenge saw Australia beat England in Brisbane in June and then again in London in November to reclaim the Cook Cup for the first time since 1999. The 2005 Cook Cup was contested over a single test, which England won 26–16 at Twickenham. In June 2006 the countries played a two-match test series in Australia, with the home team winning both matches to regain the Cup.

The Cook Cup has been contested nearly every year since, with the exception of the World Cup years (2007, 2011, 2015 and 2019). Australia retained the cup in 2008, 2009 and the mid-year tests of 2010, before England regained it in the 2010 end-of-year tests. Australia regained the cup in 2012, but since then England have dominated the series, winning it outright in 2013, 2014, 2016, 2017, 2018, 2021 and 2022. The match scheduled for Twickenham in November 2020 did not take place, making 2020 the first non-World Cup year this century in which the Cook Cup has not been contested. 

The Cook Cup was renamed the Ella-Mobbs Trophy from the July 2022 series.

Since 1909, England and Australia have played each other 55 times. England lead the series by 28 wins to 26, with one match drawn.

Summary

Overall

Records 
Note: Date shown in brackets indicates when the record was last set.

Results

List of series

Notes

References

 
England national rugby union team matches
Australia national rugby union team matches
Rugby union rivalries in Australia
Rugby union rivalries in England
English-Australian culture